This Is the Boke of Cokery, or The Boke of Cokery, is believed to be the first cookery book printed in English. The name of the author is unknown. It was printed and published by Richard Pynson in 1500. The book remained in print for many years in the 16th century, but was superseded and forgotten by the 18th. The only known surviving copy of the book is in the possession of the Marquess of Bath at Longleat House, Wiltshire.

Background
At the beginning of the 16th century, cookery books were not a novelty in England. The British Library has a manuscript, A Boke of Kokery, dating from about 1440, which draws heavily on earlier published work. The latter, dating from about 1430, consists of a "Kalendare de Potages dyvers" (a list of dishes), a "kalendare de Leche Metys" (a guide to sliced meats); and "Dyverse bake metis" (various baked meats). Like all manuscripts, such books were expensive and rare. It was not until printed versions became available that books had a wider circulation. William Caxton introduced printing to England in 1476, but the eighty or so titles that he printed did not include one on cookery; that innovation fell to Richard Pynson, nine years after Caxton's death.

This Is the Boke of Cokery was "emprynted without temple barre by Rycharde Pynson in the yere of our lorde MD". It has 124 (unnumbered) pages. The opening sentence sets out the purpose of the work:

Contents
The historian Stephen Mennell describes the book as "essentially medieval in character", focusing on the banqueting at aristocratic residences. It was not until later in the 16th century that cookery books began to give everyday recipes for use in ordinary households.
The book gives details of numerous historical royal feasts, drawing on an early manuscript of recipes now at Holkham Hall, Norfolk. An example is "The feste of kynge Harry the Fourth to the Henawdes [men of Hainaut] and Frenchemen when they had justed [jousted] in smythefelde", which comprised three courses of exotic game and meats, including "Creme of Almondes; larks, stewed potage; venyson, partryche rost; quayle, egryt; rabettes, plovers, pomerynges; and a leache of brauwne wyth batters".

Also in the book are details of the "feste of my lord chaunceler archibysshop of York at his stallacyon in Yorke the yere of our Lorde MCCCCLXV." Sixty-two cooks were employed in preparing the feast. The big birds were served with their plumage, the peacock with its tail spread. Among the drinks was "ipocrasse," a spiced wine:

Among the recipes in the book are many for dishes that subsequently fell out of use, such as "Comyne" (a dish of almond milk spiced with cumin and thickened with eggs), "Jusselle" (a meat broth with ale), "Buknade" (a dish of veal and eggs) and "Charmerchande" (a mutton stew with sage and parsley, thickened with breadcrumbs).

Later history
The book is noted by Andrew Maunsell in his 1595 Catalogue of English Printed Bookes as being in circulation in the 1530s under the title of A noble boke of festes royall and of Cookerie for Princes housholde. It appears to have had the market to itself for many years; Pynson's rival Wynkyn de Worde brought out The Boke of Kervynge (carving) in 1508, which overlaps to the extent of describing princely and lordly banqueting, but focuses on the serving rather than the cooking of such feasts. It was not until the 1540s that a recognisable successor was published – A Proper Newe Booke of Cokerye (1545). Pynson's book was evidently largely forgotten by the 18th century, when Samuel Pegge printed a survey of early English cookery books in the introduction to his edition of The Forme of Cury in 1780. In 1810, in Typographical Antiquities, Thomas Dibdin recorded that it was not known if anyone still possessed a copy.

In 1954 the copy of the book in the Longleat library – the only known surviving copy – was lent for an exhibition of cookery books going back over 450 years in London, celebrating the end of wartime and post-war food rationing.

Notes, references and sources

Notes

References

Sources
 
 
 
 
 

English non-fiction books
Early Modern cookbooks
1500 books
History of British cuisine